This is a list of films which placed number-one at the South Korean box office during 2015.

Highest-grossing films

References

 

South Korea
2015
2015 in South Korean cinema